The 2019 WNBA season was the 23rd season for the Phoenix Mercury franchise of the WNBA. The season tipped off on May 25, 2019 versus the Seattle Storm.

The Mercury's season started with the news that star Diana Taurasi would miss a significant part of the season due to a back procedure. The team started out the season 5–5 by the end of June.  This record included a three game losing streak immediately followed by a three game winning streak.  July proved more of the same as the team posted a 5–4 record.  A two game losing streak split five wins.  In August, the team went 5–6, but did secure a playoff spot.  Taurasi returned for six games during the season.  However, the team finished on a four game losing streak to end the season 15–19.  This record earned them the eighth seed in the playoffs.

As the eight seed, the Mercury traveled to the Chicago Sky in the first round.  The Mercury are the only eighth seed to win since the WNBA switched to its current playoff format in 2016.  However, they could not repeat the feat this season when they lost by 29 points.

The Mercury did well at the end of season awards with Brittney Griner leading the WNBA in scoring, Brianna Turner making the WNBA All-Rookie Team, and Leilani Mitchell winning the WNBA Most Improved Player Award.

Transactions

WNBA Draft

Trades/Roster Changes

Current roster

Game log

Preseason 

|- style="background:#bbffbb;"
| 1
| May 11
| Los Angeles Sparks
| W 82–75
| Bonner (20)
| Bonner (8)
| Smith (5)
| Talking Stick Resort Arena3,751
| 1–0
|- style="background:#bbffbb;"
| 2
| May 15
| @ Seattle Storm
| W 87–84
| Tied (15)
| Griner (6)
| Tied (3)
| Angel of the Winds Arena3,076
| 2–0

Regular season

|- style="background:#fcc;"
| 1
| May 25
| @ Seattle Storm
| L 68–77
| Bonner (31)
| Tied (8)
| Tied (4)
| Angel of the Winds Arena8,500
| 0–1
|- style="background:#bbffbb;"
| 2
| May 31
| Las Vegas Aces
| W 86–84
| Carson (20)
| Bonner (12)
| Y. Turner (10)
| Talking Stick Resort Arena14,090
| 1–1

|- style="background:#fcc;"
| 3
| June 6
| @ Minnesota Lynx
| L 56–58
| Bonner (25)
| Bonner (8)
| 3 tied (2)
| Target Center8,001
| 1–2
|- style="background:#bbffbb;"
| 4
| June 9
| @ Indiana Fever
| W 94–87
| Griner (26)
| Bonner (7)
| Mitchell (6)
| Bankers Life Fieldhouse3,336
| 2–2
|- style="background:#fcc;"
| 5
| June 11
| @ Chicago Sky
| L 75–82
| Bonner (28)
| Bonner (12)
| Bonner (6)
| Wintrust Arena4,212
| 2–3
|- style="background:#fcc;"
| 6
| June 14
| Los Angeles Sparks
| L 68–85
| Griner (24)
| Griner (13)
| January (5)
| Talking Stick Resort Arena10,381
| 2–4
|- style="background:#fcc;"
| 7
| June 20
| @ Dallas Wings
| L 54–69
| Mitchell (12)
| Bonner (8)
| January (3)
| College Park Center4,626
| 2–5
|- style="background:#bbffbb;"
| 8
| June 23
| Los Angeles Sparks
| W 82–72
| Mitchell (22)
| Griner (9)
| Mitchell (6)
| Talking Stick Resort Arena10,132
| 3–5
|- style="background:#bbffbb;"
| 9
| June 28
| Indiana Fever
| W 91–69
| Griner (23)
| 3 tied (5)
| Mitchell (11)
| Talking Stick Resort Arena9,435
| 4–5
|- style="background:#bbffbb;"
| 10
| June 30
| @ Seattle Storm
| W 69–67
| Tied (20)
| Tied (7)
| Mitchell (4)
| Alaska Airlines Arena8,002
| 5–5

|- style="background:#fcc;"
| 11
| July 5
| New York Liberty
| L 76–80
| Griner (30)
| Griner (8)
| Mitchell (4)
| Talking Stick Resort Arena9,560
| 5–6
|- style="background:#bbffbb;"
| 12
| July 7
| Atlanta Dream
| W 65–63
| Griner (31)
| Bonner (14)
| Mitchell (4)
| Talking Stick Resort Arena9,850
| 6–6
|- style="background:#bbffbb;"
| 13
| July 10
| @ Washington Mystics
| W 91–68
| Griner (25)
| Griner (8)
| January (6)
| Capital One Arena15,377
| 7–6
|- style="background:#fcc;"
| 14
| July 12
| @ Connecticut Sun
| L 64–79
| Bonner (20)
| Bonner (8)
| January (5)
| Mohegan Sun Arena6,864
| 7–7
|- style="background:#fcc;"
| 15
| July 14
| @ Minnesota Lynx
| L 62–75
| Bonner (27)
| Bonner (7)
| Mitchell (5)
| Target Center8,801
| 7–8
|- style="background:#bbffbb;"
| 16
| July 17
| Dallas Wings
| W 69–64
| Griner (23)
| Bonner (8)
| January (5)
| Talking Stick Resort Arena10,143
| 8–8
|- style="background:#bbffbb;"
| 17
| July 20
| @ Dallas Wings
| W 70–66
| Griner (17)
| Griner (8)
| January (4)
| College Park Center5,471
| 9–8
|- style="background:#bbffbb;"
| 18
| July 23
| Indiana Fever
| W 95–77
| Tied (22)
| Griner (7)
| January (7)
| Talking Stick Resort Arena8,528
| 10–8
|- style="background:#fcc;"
| 19
| July 30
| @ Washington Mystics
| L 93–99
| Griner (30)
| Griner (9)
| Mitchell (8)
| St. Elizabeth's East Arena3,819
| 10–9

|- style="background:#fcc;"
| 20
| August 1
| @ Connecticut Sun
| L 62–68
| Bonner (20)
| Bonner (10)
| Bonner (4)
| Mohegan Sun Arena6,014
| 10–10
|- style="background:#bbffbb;"
| 21
| August 4
| Washington Mystics
| W 103–82
| Griner (26)
| Griner (9)
| Griner (8)
| Talking Stick Resort Arena9,025
| 11–10
|- style="background:#fcc;"
| 22
| August 8
| @ Los Angeles Sparks
| L 74–84
| Griner (27)
| B. Turner (14)
| Tied (5)
| Staples Center10,345
| 11–11
|- style="background:#fcc;"
| 23
| August 10
| Dallas Wings
| L 77–80
| Mitchell (23)
| B. Turner (11)
| Tied (3)
| Talking Stick Resort Arena9,717
| 11–12
|- style="background:#fcc;"
| 24
| August 14
| Connecticut Sun
| L 71–78
| Bonner (17)
| B. Turner (8)
| Y. Turner (4)
| Talking Stick Resort Arena8,734
| 11–13
|- style="background:#bbffbb;"
| 25
| August 16
| Atlanta Dream
| W 77–68
| Bonner (27)
| Bonner (14)
| Mitchell (5)
| Talking Stick Resort Arena8,480
| 12–13
|- style="background:#bbffbb;"
| 26
| August  18
| New York Liberty
| W 78–72
| Bonner (30)
| Bonner (10)
| January (3)
| Talking Stick Resort Arena9,145
| 13–13
|- style="background:#fcc;"
| 27
| August  20
| @ Las Vegas Aces
| L 79–84 (OT)
| Tied (24)
| B. Turner (11)
| January (6)
| Mandalay Bay Events Center5,032
| 13–14
|- style="background:#fcc;"
| 28
| August 25
| Chicago Sky
| L 86–94
| Griner (34)
| Bonner (11)
| Bonner (5)
| Talking Stick Resort Arena12,054
| 13–15
|- style="background:#bbffbb;"
| 29
| August 27
| @ New York Liberty
| W 95–82
| Tied (29)
| Griner (10)
| Taurasi (10)
| Westchester County Center1,693
| 14–15
|- style="background:#bbffbb;"
| 30
| August 29
| @ Atlanta Dream
| W 65–58
| Griner (21)
| Tied (8)
| Taurasi (8)
| State Farm Arena3,727
| 15–15

|- style="background:#fcc;"
| 31
| September 1
| @ Chicago Sky
| L 78–105
| Griner (26)
| Bonner (12)
| Mitchell (6)
| Wintrust Arena8,845
| 15–16
|- style="background:#fcc;"
| 32
| September 3
| Seattle Storm
| L 70–82
| Griner (22)
| Griner (7)
| Tied (4)
| Talking Stick Resort Arena8,724
| 15–17
|- style="background:#fcc;"
| 33
| September 6
| Minnesota Lynx
| L 69–83
| Griner (16)
| Griner (7)
| Mitchell (4)
| Talking Stick Resort Arena12,140
| 15–18
|- style="background:#fcc;"
| 34
| September 8
| Las Vegas Aces
| L 89–98
| Griner (24)
| Bonner (8)
| 3 tied (3)
| Talking Stick Resort Arena13,135
| 15–19

Playoffs

|- style="background:#fcc;"
| 1
| September 11
| @ Chicago Sky
| L 76–105
| Bonner (21)
| Bonner (6)
| 3 tied (3)
| Wintrust Arena6,042
| 0–1

Standings

Playoffs

Statistics

Regular season

Awards and honors

References

External links
The Official Site of the Phoenix Mercury

Phoenix Mercury seasons
Phoenix Mercury